Siqqitiq (meaning transforming one's life, more specifically adopting Christianity) is the ritual of converting Inuit with shamanist beliefs to Christianity. This is usually accompanied by ritualistic consumption of foods held taboo by shamanist belief (like caribou lung and heart,) to underscore the fact that such taboos no longer apply.

The word could also refer to the communion meal itself. Umik, the first Inuit evangelist used such methods for conversion, which turned into a ritual. The practice is now rare because most Inuit are already Christians. Siqqitiqtuq (literally: getting into water, or wetting with water) means baptism.

References

 Laugrand, Frédéric; "Siqqitiqpuq: Conversion et réception du christianisme par les Inuit de l’Arctique de l’Est canadien (1890-1940)"; Ph.D. Dissertation, Université Laval, 1997.

Inuit culture
Christianity in Canada
Conversion to Christianity